Jeff Edwards (born 1959) is an American author of bestselling military thrillers. 

He has published articles and opinion columns, mostly on Military.com and military newspapers.  The majority of his published work, fiction and non-fiction pertains to the U.S. military.  Collectively, his novels have won the Admiral Nimitz Award for Outstanding Naval Fiction from the Military Writers Society of America, the American Author Medal from the American Author's Association, the Clive Cussler Grandmaster Award for Adventure Writing,  the Reader's Choice Award, and the Silver Medal for Military/Wartime Fiction from the Independent Publishers of America.

Edwards was born and raised in Savannah, Georgia.  Following a 23-year career as a sonar technician, he retired from the United States Navy as a chief petty officer.  He now resides in San Diego, California, where he writes military novels and opinion columns and works as a consultant to the military.

Bibliography

The Sea Warrior Files
 Sea of Shadows    (Stealth Books – December 2010) – Originally published as Torpedo (October 2004)
 The Seventh Angel    (Stealth Books – December 2010)
 Sword of Shiva    (Stealth Books – December 2012)

City Blues Series
 Dome City Blues    (Stealth Books – July 2011)
 Angel City Blues    (Stealth Books - September 2014)

Children's Books
 The Lonely Little Bumbershoot   (Three Jellybean Press - December 2014)

References

External links
 Author's website
 2005 Admiral Nimitz Award
 American Authors Association
 Archive of Jeff Edwards columns

1959 births
Living people
American military writers
American male novelists
21st-century American novelists
Writers from Savannah, Georgia
United States Navy sailors
20th-century American novelists
20th-century American male writers
21st-century American male writers
Novelists from Georgia (U.S. state)
20th-century American non-fiction writers
21st-century American non-fiction writers
American male non-fiction writers